Melanie Isabella Kogler (born 18 April 1985 in Salzburg) is an Austrian television and theatre actress most known for her role as Marlene von Lahnstein (née Wolf) on the hit German television series, Verbotene Liebe (Forbidden Love).

Professional career
Kogler attended the European Film Actor School in Zürich, Switzerland where she graduated in 2006. During her studies she performed in short films and plays. After graduation she performed with the Salzburg State Theatre in The Little Witch (Natascha Kalmbach) and Rembrandt B12 (Barbara Neureiter). In 2007 she starred in Markus Steinwender's staged version of Goethe's Faust as Gretchen.

Kogler made her television debut in 2007 on the ZDF crime show Die Rosenheim-Cops in the episode "A Deadly Taste", which was directed by Gunter Krää.

In der 2007-2008 theatre season Kogler resumed working on stage in at the Salzburg State Theatre.  She performed in The Talisman (Emma) by Beverly Blankenship, and in The House of Bernarda Alba (young maid) directed by Frank Brightmouth.  She also resumed her role in "The Little Witch" which was directed by Natasha Kalmbach.

Role on Verbotene Liebe (Forbidden Love)
In 2011 Kogler landed a role on the hit ARD show Verbotene Liebe.  She debuted on 24 January 2011 as Marlene von Lahnstein, a character who would have several romantic encounters with members of the aristocratic Lahnstein family.  Kogler gained international attention and praise for her performance when her character eventually fell in love with Countess Rebecca von Lahnstein (portrayed by Tatjana Kästel). Between 2012 - 2014 Kogler's character struggled with her sexual orientation whilst being engaged to a male member of the Lahnstein family, Count Tristan von Lahnstein (portrayed by Jens Hartwig).  Eventually, Marlene realizes that she cannot deny her love for Rebecca, despite her being a woman.  Kogler was named one of AfterEllen's "Top 25 Lesbian/Bi Characters on TV (Right Now)" in 2013, along with her co-star Kästel.  They were two of only three non-English speaking stars to be named on the list.

After two years in a starring role, Verbotene Liebe ended their contract with Kogler, and she left the show in September 2014.

Filmography 
 2004: Und Action...
 2004: Fräulein Julie
 2004: Der Gesang im Feuerofen
 2005: Heinrich & Henrietta
 2005: Bei Banküberfällen wird mit wahrer Liebe gehandelt
 2005: Molly Sweeney
 2006: Der kaukasische Kreidekreis
 2006: Die kleine Hexe
 2007: Rembrandt B12
 2007: Faust 1
 2007: Der Talisman
 2007: Die Rosenheim-Cops – Ein mörderischer Geschmack
 2007: Bernarda Albas Haus
 2008: Komödienstadel – G'suacht und G'fundn
 2008: Steht auf wenn ihr für Salzburg seid
 2008: Eine Mittsommernachts-Sex-Komödie
 2008: Der Sturm
 2008: Komödienstadel – Der letzte Bär von Bayern
 2009: Second Life
 2009: Komödienstadel – Endstation Drachenloch
 2009: Spielwiese
 2009: Weihnachten bei Tiger und Bär
 2010: Kasimir und Karoline
 2010: Ja (short film)
 2010: Rechtschreibung (short film)
 2010: YouDie (short film)
 2010: Impure Intent
 2011–2014: Verbotene Liebe
 2014: Wilsberg – Die Übergabe

References

External links

 Homepage for Melanie Kogler
 
 Online-Demoband von Melanie Kogler (Flash required)

German soap opera actresses
1985 births
Living people